Stephen Wesley Gorton (13 August 1952 – 23 October 2015) was an internationally renowned Australian artist and the founder of the Paddington Art School. He lived in Sydney, Australia.

Education
Stephen Wesley Gorton graduated with BA in architecture (honours) from Bristol University, UK in 1974. Later, Gorton completed a Bachelor of Architecture from Sydney University in 1976 with his major theses on "The Philosophy of Surrealism" and the art and architecture of "Antonio Gaudi". Later that year he held a one-man exhibition after being expelled from Alexander Mackie Art College for non-conformist ideas on art.

Career
Gorton was described as "one of the best contemporary draughtsmen" by Sydney Art Gallery owner and expert member of the French Art Dealer's Association, Anthony Field, who went on to say, "He is one of the few whose graphic works reach beyond local or cultural boundaries and compare favourably with the best 19th and 20th Century Masters." His artworks are owned by individuals and governments worldwide. Stephen has exhibited extensively in Europe, United States, and Australia.

In early 1999, Stephen's artwork was made more widely available through a series of limited-edition prints, promoted and distributed via the Internet. They are now available from The Untapped Source or RedBubble.

Paddington Art School
Gorton also founded the Paddington Art School in Sydney, Australia, in 1980. He ran the school for 20 years intermittently while he spent periods living in New York and Cadaqués, Spain.

Writings
In 1993, he wrote and published the book Drawing Power, which explores art and the metaphysical nature of drawing and painting. It is sold out and a new edition is in progress.

Cadaqués
From 1993 to 1994, Gorton's work was managed by Captain Peter Moore, Salvador Dalí's former manager of 25 years. During this time, Gorton lived and worked in Dalí's home town of Cadaqués, Spain, where he painted numerous portraits, homages to Dalí and was offered the commission to finish Dalí's unfinished paintings, which he declined as a matter of principle.

Exhibitions
1976 Bridges Gallery, Sydney
1977 Barry Stern Gallery, Sydney
1978 Brooklyn Collector Gallery, New York
1979 The Brownstone Gallery, New York
1980 Waverly Gallery, New York
1981 Artistic Eye Gallery, New York
1982 Streeter's Gallery, Chicago
1983/9 Continuous group exhibition with 19th and 20th Century European Masters, "Art and Joy Gallery", Sydney
1990 The Painters Gallery, Sydney
1991 Finalist, Archibald Prize Exhibition, New South Wales Art Gallery, Sydney
1993/4 Painted and exhibited in Captain Peter Moore's Salvador Dalí Museums in Cadaques, Spain
1994/5 Sophie Van Schendel's "Galleria Cadaqués 111", Cadaques, Spain
1996 The Immaculate Conceptions Gallery, Amsterdam, Holland
1997/8 Comenos Fine Art: "Group exhibition of 19th and 20th Century American and European Masters", Boston, Massachusetts, USA
2000/1 Retrospective Exhibition at the Bondi Spice Gallery, North Bondi, Sydney

Collections
Collections of Gorton's work include:
Bill Clinton, Washington DC, USA
Baron Carios Coli de Rosas, Rosas, Spain
Captain Peter Moore, Cadaqués, Spain
Versace Art Corporation, Genoa, Italy
Allan Stone Gallery New York
Comenos Fine Art, Boston Massachusetts, USA
The Robert Lockwood Collection, Sydney, Australia
Leigh Johnson

Articles and media appearances
1980 – Australian Playboy Magazine, Sydney
1984 – City Express, Sydney
1984 – Artists and Galleries of Australia
1984 – Australian Artist Magazine
1986 – Australian Artist Magazine
1987 – Simply Living Magazine, Sydney
1988 – Ray Martin's Midday Show, Channel 9, Sydney
1993 – de Volkskrant, Holland
1993 – El Periodical, Spain
1994 – Daily Telegraph, UK
1994 – On the Street Magazine, Sydney
1996 – Sydney Morning Herald, Sydney
1996 – New Idea
1999 – The Sydney Times

References

Sources
http://nla.gov.au/nla.cat-vn2869146
http://www.infineart.com/prints_gorton.html

External links
http://www.theuntappedsource.com/gallery/stephen-gorton-fine-art/436/
http://www.redbubble.com/people/stephengorton 
Stephen Wesley Gorton's website
https://web.archive.org/web/20011216002115/http://stephengorton.com/Home/home.cfm
http://www.infineart.com/bio_gorton.html
Paddington Art School website

1952 births
2015 deaths
Australian portrait painters